Marie Louise Hamilton Mack (10 October 1870 – 23 November 1935) was an Australian poet, journalist and novelist. She is most known for her writings and her involvement in World War I in 1914 as the first woman war correspondent in Belgium.

Biography
Mack was born in Hobart, Tasmania.  Her father, Hans Hamilton Mack, was a Wesleyan minister who moved the family from state to state on account of his work.  By the time she was ready for secondary school, the family had taken up residence in Sydney. Mack attended Sydney Girls High School where she met Ethel Turner.

On 8 January 1896 she married John Percy Creed (d. 1914), a barrister from Dublin; there were no children.

Louise Mack had 12 siblings.

Career
From 1898 until 1901, Mack wrote "A Woman's Letter" for The Bulletin.  Her first novel was published in 1896 and her only collection of poetry in 1901. Following this she travelled to England and Europe and did not return to Australia until 1916.

Mack wrote sixteen novels over nearly 40 years. The Spectator wrote in 1903 about her third novel, Girls Together, a companion piece to Teens: A Story of Australian School Girls, that "the narrative is distinctly interesting. The study of character is excellent".

War correspondent
In 1914 when war broke out Louise Mack was in Belgium where she continued to work as the first woman war correspondent for the Evening News and the London Daily Mail. Her eye-witness account of the German invasion of Antwerp and her adventures—A Woman's Experiences in the Great War—was published in 1915.

She was not only the first woman to be a war correspondent but she was also the first Australian to study the Germans this closely during this time. She was under shell-fire for thirty-six hours in Antwerp, and at one point went right through German lines to the city of Brussels. This fearless pursuit earned her great fame in Australia and gathered many audiences in Australian theaters, streets, and anywhere Mack was willing to tell her courageous story.

Returning to Australia
Returning to Australia in 1916, Mack gave a series of lectures about her war experiences. She frequently wrote for The Sydney Morning Herald, the Bulletin and other newspapers and magazines. On a visit to New Zealand in 1920, Mack and two others went missing for three days while mountain climbing in the Tararua Range, Otaki. When found, she was suffering from hunger and mountain sickness.

While back in Australia, in 1917–1918 she used her lectures on her war experiences to raise money for the Australian Red Cross Society.

On 1 September 1924 Louise married 33-year-old Allen Illingworth Leyland (d. 1932). In the 1930s she wrote a series of humorous but helpful articles for the Australian Women's Weekly, titled "Louise Mack advises".

Mack died in Mosman, New South Wales in 1935.

Bibliography

Novels
 The World is Round (1896)
 Teens: A Story of Australian School Girls (1897)
 Girls Together (1898)
 An Australian Girl in London (1902)
 Children of the Sun (1904)
 The Red Rose of a Summer (1909)
 Theodora's Husband (1909)
 In a White Palace (1910)
 The Romance of a Woman of Thirty (1911)
 Wife to Peter (1911)
 Attraction (1913)
 The Marriage of Edward (1913)
 The House of Daffodils (1914)
 The Music Makers: the love story of a woman composer (1914)
 Teens Triumphant (1933)
 Maiden's Prayer (1934)

Poetry collection
 Dreams in Flower (1901)

Individual poems
 "Manly Lagoon" (1893)
 "Of a Wild White Bird" (1895)
 "An Easter Song" (1897)
 "Before Exile" (1901)
 "To Sydney" (1901)

Autobiography
A Woman's Experiences in the Great War (1915)

References

External links
 Nancy Phelan, "Mack, Amy Eleanor (1876–1939)" (shared entry with Marie Louise Mack) in Dictionary of Australian Biography 
 
 
 

1870 births
1935 deaths
19th-century Australian novelists
20th-century Australian novelists
Australian poets
Australian women novelists
Australian women poets
Australian women of World War I
War correspondents of World War I
20th-century Australian women writers
19th-century Australian women writers
People from Hobart
People educated at Sydney Girls High School